Roy Watson (August 6, 1876 – June 7, 1937) was an American actor of the silent era. He appeared in more than 120 films between 1911 and 1935.

Biography
Born in Richmond, Virginia, Watson began to act on stage in 1895. He went to Hollywood in 1909. Watson's first work with films was with the Selig Company when he appeared in The Hazards of Helen. 

Watson was married to, and divorced from actress Jane Keckley. He lived at the McCadden Hotel before moving to a rest home. He died at the Hollywood Hospital in Hollywood, California, on June 7, 1937.

Selected filmography
 The Count of Monte Cristo (1912)
 The Livid Flame (1914)
 Why the Sheriff Is a Bachelor (1914)
 The Hazards of Helen (1914)
 The Soul's Cycle (1916)
 The Adventures of Kathlyn (1916)
 Cupid's Round Up (1918)
 The Trail of the Holdup Man (1919)
 Wolf Blood (1925)
 Chasing Trouble (1926)
 Speeding Hoofs (1927)
 Restless Youth (1928)
 The House of Terror (1928) a 10-chapter serial, today considered lost

References

External links

1876 births
1937 deaths
Male actors from Virginia
American male film actors
20th-century American male actors
American male silent film actors